Gabriel Alejandro Silva is a theoretical and computational neuroscientist and bioengineer, Professor of Bioengineering at the Jacobs School of Engineering and Professor of Neurosciences in the School of Medicine at the University of California San Diego (UCSD). He is also the Founding Director of the Center for Engineered Natural Intelligence (CENI) at UCSD, and is a Jacobs Faculty Endowed Scholar in Engineering.

He holds additional appointments in the Department of NanoEngineering, the BioCircuits Institute, the Neurosciences Graduate Program, Computational Neurobiology Program, and Institute for Neural Computation.

Research 
The research done by Silva and his collaborators is focused on the mathematics, physics, and engineering of structure-function dynamics in spatial-temporal geometric networks in the brain. The goal is to understand how the shape and signaling dynamics of individual neurons and astrocytes, the connectivity and geometry of networks of neurons, and networks of interacting brain regions produce algorithmic and functional properties that allow the brain to learn, compute, and process information and data.

A related goal is understanding what changes in these processes in autism spectrum disorder and related neurodevelopmental disorders. From an engineering perspective they are developing mathematical models and algorithms derived from an understanding of the biological brain to build next generation machine learning and brain machine interfaces that can learn and adapt to their environments and new data without prior training.

Early work 
Silva's early work during his Masters involved investigating the physiology of astrocyte neural glial cells in the spinal cord and spinal cord injury.

His Ph.D. work modeled the neurophysiology and calcium dynamics of rod photoreceptor neurons in the retina. Silva's thesis work involved electrophysiology of the retina using a method called paired-flash electroretinography, and  modeling of the resultant data to understand how rod photoreceptors adapt to changing light levels.

His postdoc work at Northwestern was focused on the development and use of nanotechnologies applied to neuroscience. Specifically, Silva and his colleagues showed that neural progenitor stem cells could be induced to differentiate into neurons following the self-assembling encapsulation in peptide amphiphile nanofibers.

At UCSD 
Silva's work at UCSD has included experimental neuroscience, theoretical and computational neuroscience, and neural engineering.

He has worked on mathematical and physical modeling and simulations of neural processes at molecular, cellular, and systems scales, for the purpose of understanding how structures in the brain represent and process information, with a particular focus on modeling the calcium signaling dynamics of astrocyte neural glial cells. He has  also worked  work focuses on the theoretical analysis of dynamic signaling in networks    He has developed a  new machine learning architecture that will be able to learn without prior training or exposure to data.

Applied nanotechnology 
He previous worked on the development of self assembling nanotechnologies for neural regeneration during his postdoc, and the optimization of chemically functionalized quantum dots to achieve high resolution imaging of cellular structure and calcium dynamics at UCSD.  Most recently, in collaboration with Nanovision Biosciences, Silva's group has been one of several labs involved in the development of a surgically implantable optoelectronic retinal neural prosthesis to restore vision Silva's previous published work has addressed traumatic spinal cord injury and reactive gliosis, Alzheimer's disease, retinal prosthesis, and most recently the systems neuroscience of autism spectrum disorder (ASD) and related neurodevelopmental disorders.

Honors   
Silva   in 2017 he was appointed a Jacobs Faculty Endowed Scholar in Engineering, and in 2016 elected into the  College of Fellows of the American Institute of Medical and Biological Engineering.... In 2008 he was awarded the YC Fung Young Investigator Award and Medal by the  American Society of Mechanical Engineers (ASME)

He was featured in a piece in the San Diego Tribune "A Scientist's Life: 10 Things UCSD's Gabriel Silva Has Done". His work has been featured and written about in numerous news and popular science sources.

References 

Year of birth missing (living people)
Living people
University of Toronto alumni
University of California, San Diego faculty
University of Illinois Chicago alumni
Northwestern University alumni
American neuroscientists
American bioengineers
Canadian neuroscientists
Canadian bioengineers